Applied behavior analysis (ABA), also called behavioral engineering, is a psychological intervention that applies empirical approaches based upon the principles of respondent and operant conditioning to change behavior of social significance. It is the applied form of behavior analysis; the other two forms are radical behaviorism (or the philosophy of the science) and the experimental analysis of behavior (or basic experimental laboratory research).

The name applied behavior analysis has replaced behavior modification because the latter approach suggested attempting to change behavior without clarifying the relevant behavior-environment interactions. In contrast, ABA changes behavior by first assessing the functional relationship between a targeted behavior and the environment. Further, the approach often seeks to develop socially acceptable alternatives for aberrant behaviors.

Although service delivery providers overwhelmingly specialize in utilizing structured and naturalistic early behavioral interventions for individuals with autism, ABA has also been utilized in a range of other areas.  

ABA is controversial, especially among members of the autism rights movement, for a number of reasons. There is a perception that some ABA interventions emphasize normalization, instead of acceptance, and a history of, in some embodiments of ABA and its predecessors, the use of aversives, such as electric shocks. In the last few years, there have been reforms in some types of ABA interventions to address these criticisms and concerns, especially regarding masking.  ABA is also controversial due to its relatively weak evidence base.

Definition
ABA is an applied science devoted to developing procedures which will produce observable changes in behavior. It is to be distinguished from the experimental analysis of behavior, which focuses on basic experimental laboratory research, but it uses principles developed by such research, in particular operant conditioning and classical conditioning. Behavior analysis adopts the viewpoint of radical behaviorism, treating thoughts, emotions, and other covert activity as behavior that is subject to the same rules as overt responses. This represents a shift away from methodological behaviorism, which restricts behavior-change procedures to behaviors that are overt, and was the conceptual underpinning of behavior modification.

Behavior analysts also emphasize that the science of behavior must be a natural science as opposed to a social science. As such, behavior analysts focus on the observable relationship of behavior with the environment, including antecedents and consequences, without resort to "hypothetical constructs".

History

The beginnings of ABA can be traced back to Teodoro Ayllon and Jack Michael's study "The psychiatric nurse as a behavioral engineer" (1959) that they published in the Journal of the Experimental Analysis of Behavior (JEAB). Ayllon and Michael were training the staff at a psychiatric hospital how to use a token economy based on the principles of operant conditioning for patients with schizophrenia and intellectual disability, which led to researchers at the University of Kansas to start the Journal of Applied Behavior Analysis (JABA) in 1968.

A group of researchers at the University of Washington, including Donald Baer, Sidney W. Bijou, Bill Hopkins, Jay Birnbrauer, Todd Risley, and Montrose Wolf, applied the principles of behavior analysis to manage the behavior of children and adolescents in juvenile detention centers and organize employees who required proper structure and management in businesses. In 1968, Baer, Bijou, Risley, Birnbrauer, Wolf, and James Sherman joined the Department of Human Development and Family Life at the University of Kansas, where they founded the Journal of Applied Behavior Analysis.

Notable graduate students from the University of Washington include Robert Wahler, James Sherman, and Ivar Lovaas. Lovaas established the UCLA Young Autism Project while teaching at the University of California, Los Angeles. In 1965, Lovaas published a series of articles that described a pioneering investigation of the antecedents and consequences that maintained a problem behavior, and relied on the methods of errorless learning which was initially used by Charles Ferster to teach nonverbal children to speak. Lovaas also described how to use social (secondary) reinforcers, teach children to imitate, and what interventions (including electric shocks) may be used to reduce aggression and life-threatening self-injury.

In 1987, Lovaas published the study, "Behavioral treatment and normal educational and intellectual functioning in young autistic children". The experimental group in this study received an average of 40 hours per week in a 1:1 teaching setting at a table using errorless discrete trial training (DTT). The treatment is done at home with parents involved, and the curriculum is highly individualized with a heavy emphasis on teaching eye contact, fine and gross motor imitation, and language. The use of aversives and reinforcement were used to motivate learning and reduce non-desired behaviors. Early development of the therapy in the 1960s involved use of shocks and the withholding of food. By the time children were enrolled in this study, such aversives were abandoned, and a loud "no" or a slap to the thigh were used only as a last resort to reduce aggressive and self-stimulatory behaviors. The outcome of this study indicated 47% of the experimental group (9/19) went on to lose their autism diagnosis and were described as indistinguishable from their typical adolescent peers. This included passing education without assistance and making and maintaining friends. These gains were maintained as reported in the 1993 study, "Long-term outcome for children with autism who received early intensive behavioral treatment". Lovaas' work went on to be recognized by the US Surgeon General in 1999, and his research were replicated in university and private settings. The "Lovaas Method" went on to become known as early intensive behavioral intervention (EIBI).

Over the years, "behavior analysis" gradually superseded "behavior modification"; that is, from simply trying to alter problematic behavior, behavior analysts sought to understand the function of that behavior, what reinforcement histories (i.e., attention seeking, escape, sensory stimulation, etc.) promote and maintain it, and how it can be replaced by successful behavior. This analysis is based on careful initial assessment of a behavior's function and a testing of methods that produce changes in behavior.

While ABA seems to be intrinsically linked to autism intervention, it is also used in a broad range of other situations. Recent notable areas of research in the Journal of Applied Behavior Analysis include autism, classroom instruction with typically developing students, pediatric feeding therapy, and substance use disorders. Other applications of ABA include applied animal behavior, consumer behavior analysis, forensic behavior analysis, behavioral medicine, behavioral neuroscience, clinical behavior analysis, organizational behavior management, schoolwide positive behavior support, and contact desensitization for phobias.

Characteristics

Baer, Wolf, and Risley's 1968 article is still used as the standard description of ABA. It lists the following seven characteristics of ABA.
 Applied: ABA focuses on the social significance of the behavior studied. For example, a non-applied researcher may study eating behavior because this research helps to clarify metabolic processes, whereas the applied researcher may study eating behavior in individuals who eat too little or too much, trying to change such behavior so that it is more acceptable to the persons involved.
 Behavioral: ABA is pragmatic; it asks how it is possible to get an individual to do something effectively. To answer this question, the behavior itself must be objectively measured. Verbal descriptions are treated as behavior in themselves, and not as substitutes for the behavior described.
 Analytic: Behavior analysis is successful when the analyst understands and can manipulate the events that control a target behavior. This may be relatively easy to do in the lab, where a researcher is able to arrange the relevant events, but it is not always easy, or ethical, in an applied situation. Baer et al. outline two methods that may be used in applied settings to demonstrate control while maintaining ethical standards. These are the reversal design and the multiple baseline design. In the reversal design, the experimenter first measures the behavior of choice, introduces an intervention, and then measures the behavior again. Then, the intervention is removed, or reduced, and the behavior is measured yet again. The intervention is effective to the extent that the behavior changes and then changes back in response to these manipulations. The multiple baseline method may be used for behaviors that seem irreversible. Here, several behaviors are measured and then the intervention is applied to each in turn. The effectiveness of the intervention is revealed by changes in just the behavior to which the intervention is being applied. 
 Technological: The description of analytic research must be clear and detailed, so that any competent researcher can repeat it accurately. Cooper et al. describe a good way to check this: Have a person trained in applied behavior analysis read the description and then act out the procedure in detail. If the person makes any mistakes or has to ask any questions then the description needs improvement.
 Conceptually Systematic: Behavior analysis should not simply produce a list of effective interventions. Rather, to the extent possible, these methods should be grounded in behavioral principles. This is aided by the use of theoretically meaningful terms, such as "secondary reinforcement" or "errorless discrimination" where appropriate.
 Effective: Though analytic methods should be theoretically grounded, they must be effective. If an intervention does not produce a large enough effect for practical use, then the analysis has failed
 Generality: Behavior analysts should aim for interventions that are generally applicable; the methods should work in different environments, apply to more than one specific behavior, and have long-lasting effects.

Other proposed characteristics

In 2005, Heward et al. suggested that the following five characteristics should be added:
 Accountable: To be accountable means that ABA must be able to demonstrate that its methods are effective. This requires the repeatedly measuring the effect of interventions (success, failure or no effect at all), and, if necessary, making changes that improve their effectiveness.
 Public: The methods, results, and theoretical analyses of ABA must be published and open to scrutiny. There are no hidden treatments or mystical, metaphysical explanations.
 Doable: To be generally useful, interventions should be available to a variety of individuals, who might be teachers, parents, therapists, or even those who wish to modify their own behavior. With proper planning and training, many interventions can be applied by almost anyone willing to invest the effort.
 Empowering: ABA provides tools that give the practitioner feedback on the results of interventions. These allow clinicians to assess their skill level and build confidence in their effectiveness.
 Optimistic: According to several leading authors , behavior analysts have cause to be optimistic that their efforts are socially worthwhile, for the following reasons:
 The behaviors impacted by behavior analysis are largely determined by learning and controlled by manipulable aspects of the environment.
 Practitioners can improve performance by direct and continuous measurements.
 As a practitioner uses behavioral techniques with positive outcomes, they become more confident of future success.
 The literature provides many examples of success in teaching individuals considered previously unteachable.

Use in the treatment of autism
A large majority of ABA practitioners specialise in autism, although BCBA certification does not require any autism training. ABA-based techniques are often used to teach adaptive behaviors or to diminish behaviors associated with autism, so much that ABA itself is often mistakenly considered to be synonymous with therapy for autism. According to a paper from 2007, it was considered to be an effective "intervention for challenging behaviors" by the American Academy of Pediatrics. A 2018 Cochrane review of five studies that compared treatment vs. control showed that ABA may be effective for some autistic children, but noted that the evidence for this is weak. The effectiveness of ABA treatments for autism may be overall limited by diagnostic severity, age of intervention, and IQ.

Efficacy

2020 onward reviews 
Justin B. Leaf and others examined and responded to criticisms of ABA in a 2021 paper.

The results of two studies surveying autistic adults who went through ABA as a child found that a majority perceived ABA to have a detrimental impact on their lives, although in common with most ABA research, the studies had methodological concerns and a risk of bias. Two 2020 reviews found that very few studies directly reported on or investigated possible harms; although a significant number of studies mentioned adverse events in their analysis of why people withdrew from them, there was no effort to monitor or collect data on adverse outcomes.

2010-2019 reviews 
In 2011, investigators from Vanderbilt University under contract with the Agency for Healthcare Research and Quality performed a comprehensive review of the scientific literature on ABA-based and other therapies for autism spectrum disorders; the ABA-based therapies included the UCLA/Lovaas method and the Early Start Denver Model (the latter developed by Sally Rogers and Geraldine Dawson). They concluded that "both approaches were associated with ... improvements in cognitive performance, language skills, and adaptive behavior skills". However, they also concluded that "the strength of evidence ... is low", "many children continue to display prominent areas of impairment", "subgroups may account for a majority of the change", there is "little evidence of practical effectiveness or feasibility beyond research studies", and the published studies "used small samples, different treatment approaches and duration, and different outcome measurements".

A preliminary 2014 study indicated that there might be a publication bias against single-subject research studies that show that ABA is ineffective. Publication bias could lead to exaggerated estimates of intervention effects observed by single-subject studies.

A 2019 meta-analysis found some evidence in favour of behavioral interventions, but noted that "methodological rigor remains a pressing concern in this area of research" and, when they limited their scope to RCT designs and outcomes for which there was no risk of detection bias, found no significant effects on any outcome, for any of the approaches they looked at.

2007-2009 reviews 
A 2007 clinical report of the American Academy of Pediatrics concluded that the benefit of ABA-based interventions in autism spectrum disorders (ASDs) "has been well documented" and that "children who receive early intensive behavioral treatment have been shown to make substantial, sustained gains in IQ, language, academic performance, and adaptive behavior as well as some measures of social behavior". In 2008, Researchers from the MIND Institute published an evidence-based review of comprehensive treatment approaches. On the basis of "the strength of the findings from the four best-designed, controlled studies", they were of the opinion that one ABA-based approach (the Lovaas technique created by Ole Ivar Løvaas) is "well-established" for improving intellectual performance of young children with ASD.

A 2009 review of psycho-educational interventions for children with autism whose mean age was six years or less at intake found that five high-quality ("Level 1" or "Level 2") studies assessed ABA-based treatments. On the basis of these and other studies, the author concluded that ABA is "well-established" and is "demonstrated effective in enhancing global functioning in pre-school children with autism when treatment is intensive and carried out by trained therapists". However, the review committee also concluded that "there is a great need for more knowledge about which interventions are most effective". A 2009 paper included a descriptive analysis, an effect size analysis, and a meta-analysis of 13 reports published from 1987 to 2007 of early intensive behavioral intervention (EIBI, a form of ABA-based treatment with origins in the Lovaas technique) for autism. It determined that EIBI's effect sizes were "generally positive" for IQ, adaptive behavior, expressive language, and receptive language. The paper did note limitations of its findings including the lack of published comparisons between EIBI and other "empirically validated treatment programs". In a 2009 systematic review of 11 studies published from 1987 to 2007, the researchers wrote "there is strong evidence that EIBI is effective for some, but not all, children with autism spectrum disorders, and there is wide variability in response to treatment". Furthermore, any improvements are likely to be greatest in the first year of intervention.

A 2009 meta-analysis of nine studies published from 1987 to 2007 concluded that EIBI has a "large" effect on full-scale intelligence and a "moderate" effect on adaptive behavior in autistic children. A 2009 systematic review and meta-analysis by Spreckley and Boyd of four small-n 2000–2007 studies (involving a total of 76 children) came to different conclusions than the aforementioned reviews. Spreckley and Boyd reported that applied behavior intervention (ABI), another name for EIBI, did not significantly improve outcomes compared with standard care of preschool children with ASD in the areas of cognitive outcome, expressive language, receptive language, and adaptive behavior. In a letter to the editor, however, authors of the four studies meta-analyzed claimed that Spreckley and Boyd had misinterpreted one study comparing two forms of ABI with each other as a comparison of ABI with standard care, which erroneously decreased the observed efficacy of ABI. Furthermore, the four studies' authors raised the possibility that Spreckley and Boyd had excluded some other studies unnecessarily, and that including such studies could have led to a more favorable evaluation of ABI. Spreckley, Boyd, and the four studies' authors did agree that large multi-site randomized trials are needed to improve the understanding of ABA's efficacy in autism.

Criticism 
Researchers and advocates have critiqued the leniency of the ABA ethical code, discussing how it does not restrict or clarify the "appropriate use of aversives", does not require competency as ABA therapists are "not required to take even a single class on autism, brain function or child development", and its view of the client as the parent meaning that requiring "client consent" only requires parental consent, not the person receiving services. Similarly, because the parent is seen as the client, the goals that are set under the ethical code are according to the client's needs, which often means that focusing on changing autistic behaviors for the benefit of the parent and not the child is considered ethical.

Another criticism of the Lovaas Method is Lovaas's connection with gay conversion therapy, using his own behavior modification techniques seen in ABA in The Feminine Boy project. Similarities in gay conversion therapy to making boys indistinguishable from their heterosexual peers have been drawn with Lovaas' belief that ABA makes "autistic children indistinguishable from their normal friends." According to social worker and researcher Jake Pyne, ableism is the reason why ABA continues to be practiced in some jurisdictions where conversion therapy is prohibited, despite underlying similarities.

One study revealed extensive undisclosed conflict of interest (COI) in published ABA studies. 84% of studies published in top behavioral journals over a period of one year had at least one author with a conflict of interest involving their employment, either as an ABA clinical provider or a training consultant to ABA clinical providers. However, only 2% of these studies disclosed the COI.

Some bioethicists argue that employing ABA violates the principles of justice and nonmaleficence and infringes on the autonomy of autistic children, and their parents as well.

Another concern is that ABA research only measures behavior as a means of success, which has led to a lack of qualitative research about autistic experiences of ABA, a lack of research examining the internal effects of ABA and a lack of research for autistic children who are non-speaking or have comorbid intellectual disabilities (which is concerning considering this is one of the major populations that intensive ABA focuses on). Research is also lacking about whether ABA is effective long-term and very little longitudinal outcomes have been studied.

One more area of critique has been the "ideological warfare" surrounding ABA and TEACCH, despite the philosophies and practices of the two approaches not necessarily being in opposition. The rhetoric surrounding ABA was criticized by The British Institute of Learning Disabilities, including parents and professionals that claim that ABA "cured" their child's autism, like one parent who "claims that ABA had saved her children's lives, likening it to chemotherapy as a treatment for cancer."

Views of Autistic community 

The value of eliminating autistic behaviors is disputed by proponents of neurodiversity, who claim that it forces autistic people to mask their true personalities on behalf of a narrow conception of normality. Masking is associated with suicidality and poor long-term mental health. Autism advocates contend that it is cruel to try to make autistic people "normal" without consideration for how this may affect their well-being. Instead, these critics advocate for increased social acceptance of harmless autistic traits and therapies focused on improving quality of life.

A 2020 study examined perspectives of autistic adults that received ABA as children and found that the overwhelming majority reported that "behaviorist methods create painful lived experiences", that ABA led to the "erosion of the true actualizing self", and that they felt they had a "lack of self-agency within interpersonal experiences."

Use of aversives 

Some embodiments of applied behavior analysis as devised by Ole Ivar Lovaas used aversives such as electric shocks to modify undesirable behavior in their initial use in the 1970s, as well as slapping and shouting in a 1987 study. Over time the use of aversives lessened and in 2012 their use was described as being inconsistent with contemporary practice. However, aversives have continued to be used in some ABA programs. In comments made in 2014 to the US Food and Drug Administration (FDA), a clinician who previously worked at the Judge Rotenberg Educational Center claimed that "all textbooks used for thorough training of applied behavior analysts include an overview of the principles of punishment, including the use of electrical stimulation."

In 2010, the UN's Special Rapporteur on Torture described the Judge Rotenberg Center's use of electrical shocks on children as torture. In 2020, the FDA banned the use of electrical stimulation devices used for self-injurious or aggressive behavior and asserted that "Evidence indicates a number of significant psychological and physical risks are associated with the use of these devices, including worsening of underlying symptoms, depression, anxiety, posttraumatic stress disorder, pain, burns and tissue damage." In the same year, the U.S. Court of Appeals for the D.C. Circuit overturned the ban, ruling that the FDA "has no authority to choose what medical devices a practitioner should prescribe or administer or for which conditions" and the school announced that it would resume the use of electrical shocks.

Concepts

Behavior

Behavior refers to the movement of some part of an organism that changes some aspect of the environment. Often, the term behavior refers to a class of responses that share physical dimensions or functions, and in that case a response is a single instance of that behavior. If a group of responses have the same function, this group may be called a response class. Repertoire refers to the various responses available to an individual; the term may refer to responses that are relevant to a particular situation, or it may refer to everything a person can do.

Operant conditioning

Operant behavior is the so-called "voluntary" behavior that is sensitive to, or controlled by its consequences. Specifically, operant conditioning refers to the three-term contingency that uses stimulus control, in particular an antecedent contingency called the discriminative stimulus (SD) that influences the strengthening or weakening of behavior through such consequences as reinforcement or punishment. The term is used quite generally, from reaching for a candy bar, to turning up the heat to escape an aversive chill, to studying for an exam to get good grades.

Respondent (classical) conditioning

Respondent (classical) conditioning is based on innate stimulus-response relationships called reflexes. In his famous experiments with dogs, Pavlov usually used the salivary reflex, namely salivation (unconditioned response) following the taste of food (unconditioned stimulus). Pairing a neutral stimulus, for example a bell (conditioned stimulus) with food caused the dog to elicit salivation (conditioned response). Thus, in classical conditioning, the conditioned stimulus becomes a signal for a biologically significant consequence. Note that in respondent conditioning, unlike operant conditioning, the response does not produce a reinforcer or punisher (e.g. the dog does not get food because it salivates).

Reinforcement

Reinforcement is the key element in operant conditioning and in most behavior change programs. It is the process by which behavior is strengthened. If a behavior is followed closely in time by a stimulus and this results in an increase in the future frequency of that behavior, then the stimulus is a positive reinforcer. If the removal of an event serves as a reinforcer, this is termed negative reinforcement. There are multiple schedules of reinforcement that affect the future probability of behavior. "[H]e would get Beth to comply by hugging him and giving her food as a reward"

Punishment

Punishment is a process by which a consequence immediately follows a behavior which decreases the future frequency of that behavior. As with reinforcement, a stimulus can be added (positive punishment) or removed (negative punishment). Broadly, there are three types of punishment: presentation of aversive stimuli (e.g. pain), response cost (removal of desirable stimuli as in monetary fines), and restriction of freedom (as in a 'time out'). Punishment in practice can often result in unwanted side effects. Some other potential unwanted effects include resentment over being punished, attempts to escape the punishment, expression of pain and negative emotions associated with it, and recognition by the punished individual between the punishment and the person delivering it. "He would use loud sounds of 100 decibels on two 5-year-old autistic twins"

Extinction

Extinction is the technical term to describe the procedure of withholding/discontinuing reinforcement of a previously reinforced behavior, resulting in the decrease of that behavior. The behavior is then set to be extinguished (Cooper et al.). Extinction procedures are often preferred over punishment procedures, as many punishment procedures are deemed unethical and in many states prohibited. Nonetheless, extinction procedures must be implemented with utmost care by professionals, as they are generally associated with extinction bursts. An extinction burst is the temporary increase in the frequency, intensity, and/or duration of the behavior targeted for extinction. Other characteristics of an extinction burst include an extinction-produced aggression—the occurrence of an emotional response to an extinction procedure often manifested as aggression; and b) extinction-induced response variability—the occurrence of novel behaviors that did not typically occur prior to the extinction procedure. These novel behaviors are a core component of shaping procedures.

Discriminated operant and three-term contingency

In addition to a relation being made between behavior and its consequences, operant conditioning also establishes relations between antecedent conditions and behaviors. This differs from the S–R formulations (If-A-then-B), and replaces it with an AB-because-of-C formulation. In other words, the relation between a behavior (B) and its context (A) is because of consequences (C), more specifically, this relationship between AB because of C indicates that the relationship is established by prior consequences that have occurred in similar contexts. This antecedent–behavior–consequence contingency is termed the three-term contingency. A behavior which occurs more frequently in the presence of an antecedent condition than in its absence is called a discriminated operant. The antecedent stimulus is called a discriminative stimulus (SD). The fact that the discriminated operant occurs only in the presence of the discriminative stimulus is an illustration of stimulus control. More recently behavior analysts have been focusing on conditions that occur prior to the circumstances for the current behavior of concern that increased the likelihood of the behavior occurring or not occurring. These conditions have been referred to variously as "Setting Event", "Establishing Operations", and "Motivating Operations" by various researchers in their publications.

Verbal behavior

B. F. Skinner's classification system of behavior analysis has been applied to treatment of a host of communication disorders. Skinner's system includes:
 Tact – a verbal response evoked by a non-verbal antecedent and maintained by generalized conditioned reinforcement.
 Mand – behavior under control of motivating operations maintained by a characteristic reinforcer.
 Intraverbals – verbal behavior for which the relevant antecedent stimulus was other verbal behavior, but which does not share the response topography of that prior verbal stimulus (e.g., responding to another speaker's question).
 Autoclitic – secondary verbal behavior which alters the effect of primary verbal behavior on the listener. Examples involve quantification, grammar, and qualifying statements (e.g., the differential effects of "I think..." vs. "I know...")

Skinner's use of behavioral techniques was famously critiqued by the linguist Noam Chomsky through an extensive breakdown of how Skinner's view of language as behavioral simply can't explain the complexity of human language. This suggests that while behaviorist techniques can teach language, it is a very poor measure to explain language fundamentals. Considering Chomsky's critiques, it may be more appropriate to teach language through a Speech language pathologist instead of a behaviorist.

For an assessment of verbal behavior from Skinner's system, see Assessment of Basic Language and Learning Skills.

Measuring behavior

When measuring behavior, there are both dimensions of behavior and quantifiable measures of behavior. In applied behavior analysis, the quantifiable measures are a derivative of the dimensions. These dimensions are repeatability, temporal extent, and temporal locus.

Repeatability

Response classes occur repeatedly throughout time—i.e., how many times the behavior occurs.
 Count is the number of occurrences in behavior.
 Rate/frequency is the number of instances of behavior per unit of time.
 Celeration is the measure of how the rate changes over time.

Temporal extent

This dimension indicates that each instance of behavior occupies some amount of time—i.e., how long the behavior occurs.
 Duration is the period of time over which the behavior occurs.

Temporal locus

Each instance of behavior occurs at a specific point in time—i.e., when the behavior occurs.
 Response latency is the measure of elapsed time between the onset of a stimulus and the initiation of the response.
 Interresponse time is the amount of time that occurs between two consecutive instances of a response class.

Derivative measures

Derivative measures are unrelated to specific dimensions:
 Percentage is the ratio formed by combining the same dimensional quantities.
 Trials-to-criterion are the number of response opportunities needed to achieve a predetermined level of performance.
Applied behavior analysis is a goal discipline and spotlights on the dependable measurement and objective assessment of noticeable way of behaving. Without measuring behavior and assessing the information, behavior analysts wouldn't know whether to change the program we are chipping away at, when to switch or add new targets or when to change strategies to gain more noteworthy progress.

Behavior Analysts utilize a few distinct techniques to gather information. A portion of the ways of collect data information include:

Frequency 
 This technique refers to the times that an objective way of behaving was noticed and counted.

Rate 
Same as frequency, yet inside a predefined time limit.

Duration 
This estimation alludes to how much time that somebody participated in a way of behaving.

Fluency 
This estimation refers to how rapidly a student can give reactions inside a timeframe.

Response latency 
Latency refers to how much time after a particular boost has been given before the objective way of behaving happens

Analyzing behavior change

Experimental control

In applied behavior analysis, all experiments should include the following:
 At least one participant
 At least one behavior (dependent variable)
 At least one setting
 A system for measuring the behavior and ongoing visual analysis of data
 At least one treatment or intervention condition
 Manipulations of the independent variable so that its effects on the dependent variable may be quantitatively or qualitatively analyzed
 An intervention that will benefit the participant in some way (Behavioral Cusp)

Methodologies developed through ABA research

Task analysis

Task analysis is a process in which a task is analyzed into its component parts so that those parts can be taught through the use of chaining: forward chaining, backward chaining and total task presentation. Task analysis has been used in organizational behavior management, a behavior analytic approach to changing the behaviors of members of an organization (e.g., factories, offices, or hospitals). Behavioral scripts often emerge from a task analysis. Bergan conducted a task analysis of the behavioral consultation relationship and Thomas Kratochwill developed a training program based on teaching Bergan's skills. A similar approach was used for the development of microskills training for counselors. Ivey would later call this "behaviorist" phase a very productive one and the skills-based approach came to dominate counselor training during 1970–90. Task analysis was also used in determining the skills needed to access a career. In education, Englemann (1968) used task analysis as part of the methods to design the Direct Instruction curriculum.

Chaining

The skill to be learned is broken down into small units for easy learning. For example, a person learning to brush teeth independently may start with learning to unscrew the toothpaste cap. Once they have learned this, the next step may be squeezing the tube, etc.

For problem behavior, chains can also be analyzed and the chain can be disrupted to prevent the problem behavior. Some behavior therapies, such as dialectical behavior therapy, make extensive use of behavior chain analysis, but is not philosophically behavior analytic.

There are two types of chain in the ABA world: forward chain and backward chain. Forward chain is when you start with the first step and continue until you get to the final step. While backward chain is when you start with the last step and move backward until you reach the first step.

Prompting

A prompt is a cue that is used to encourage a desired response from an individual. Prompts are often categorized into a prompt hierarchy from most intrusive to least intrusive, although there is some controversy about what is considered most intrusive, those that are physically intrusive or those that are hardest prompt to fade (e.g., verbal). In order to minimize errors and ensure a high level of success during learning, prompts are given in a most-to-least sequence and faded systematically. During this process, prompts are faded as quickly as possible so that the learner does not come to depend on them and eventually behaves appropriately without prompting.

Types of prompts
Prompters might use any or all of the following to suggest the desired response:
 Vocal prompts: Words or other vocalizations
 Visual prompts: A visual cue or picture
 Gestural prompts: A physical gesture
 Positional prompt: e.g., the target item is placed close to the individual.
 Modeling: Modeling the desired response. This type of prompt is best suited for individuals who learn through imitation and can attend to a model.
 Physical prompts: Physically manipulating the individual to produce the desired response. There are many degrees of physical prompts, from quite intrusive (e.g. the teacher places a hand on the learner's hand) to minimally intrusive (e.g. a slight tap).

This is not an exhaustive list of prompts; the nature, number, and order of prompts are chosen to be the most effective for a particular individual.

Fading

The overall goal is for an individual to eventually not need prompts. As an individual gains mastery of a skill at a particular prompt level, the prompt is faded to a less intrusive prompt. This ensures that the individual does not become overly dependent on a particular prompt when learning a new behavior or skill.

One of the primary choices that was made while showing another way of behaving is the manner by which to fade the prompts or prompts. An arrangement should be set up to fade the prompts in an organized style. For instance, blurring the actual brief of directing a kid's hands might follow this succession: (a) supporting wrists, (b) contacting hands softly, (c) contacting lower arm or elbow, and (d) pulling out actual contact through and through. Fading guarantees that the kid doesn't turn out to be excessively subject to a specific brief while mastering another expertise.

Thinning a reinforcement schedule

Thinning is often confused with fading. Fading refers to a prompt being removed, where thinning refers to an increase in the time or number of responses required between reinforcements. Periodic thinning that produces a 30% decrease in reinforcement has been suggested as an efficient way to thin. Schedule thinning is often an important and neglected issue in contingency management and token economy systems, especially when these are developed by unqualified practitioners (see professional practice of behavior analysis).

Generalization

Generalization is the expansion of a student's performance ability beyond the initial conditions set for acquisition of a skill. Generalization can occur across people, places, and materials used for teaching. For example, once a skill is learned in one setting, with a particular instructor, and with specific materials, the skill is taught in more general settings with more variation from the initial acquisition phase. For example, if a student has successfully mastered learning colors at the table, the teacher may take the student around the house or school and generalize the skill in these more natural environments with other materials. Behavior analysts have spent considerable amount of time studying factors that lead to generalization.

Shaping

Shaping involves gradually modifying the existing behavior into the desired behavior. If the student engages with a dog by hitting it, then they could have their behavior shaped by reinforcing interactions in which they touch the dog more gently. Over many interactions, successful shaping would replace the hitting behavior with patting or other gentler behavior. Shaping is based on a behavior analyst's thorough knowledge of operant conditioning principles and extinction. Recent efforts to teach shaping have used simulated computer tasks.

One teaching technique found to be effective with some students, particularly children, is the use of video modeling (the use of taped sequences as exemplars of behavior). It can be used by therapists to assist in the acquisition of both verbal and motor responses, in some cases for long chains of behavior.

Another example of shaping is when a toddler learns to walk. The child is reinforced by crawling, standing, taking a few steps, and then eventually walking. When a child is learning to walk, they are praised by a lot of claps and excitements.

Interventions based on an FBA

Functional behavioral assessment (FBA) is an individualized critical thinking process for tending to address problem behavior. An evaluation is led to distinguish the reason or capability of a problem behavior. This evaluation interaction includes gathering data about the ecological circumstances that go before the issue conduct and the resulting rewards that reinforce the way of behaving. The data that is collected is then used to recognize and execute individualized interventions pointed toward lessening issue ways of behaving and expanding positive ways of behaving.

Critical to behavior analytic interventions is the concept of a systematic behavioral case formulation with a functional behavioral assessment or analysis at the core. This approach should apply a behavior analytic theory of change (see Behavioral change theories). This formulation should include a thorough functional assessment, a skills assessment, a sequential analysis (behavior chain analysis), an ecological assessment, a look at existing evidenced-based behavioral models for the problem behavior (such as Fordyce's model of chronic pain) and then a treatment plan based on how environmental factors influence behavior. Some argue that behavior analytic case formulation can be improved with an assessment of rules and rule-governed behavior. Some of the interventions that result from this type of conceptualization involve training specific communication skills to replace the problem behaviors as well as specific setting, antecedent, behavior, and consequence strategies.

Major journals 
Applied behavior analysts publish in many journals. Some examples of "core" behavior analytic journals are:
 Applied Animal Behaviour Science
 Behavioral Health and Medicine
 Behavior Analysis: Research and Practice
 Behavior and Philosophy
 Behavior and Social Issues
 Behavior Modification
 Behavior Therapy
 Journal of Applied Behavior Analysis
 Journal of Behavior Analysis of Offender and Victim: Treatment and Prevention
 Journal of Behavior Analysis of Sports, Health, Fitness, and Behavioral Medicine
 Journal of Contextual Behavioral Science
 Journal of Early and Intensive Behavior Interventions
 Journal of Organizational Behavior Management
 Journal of Positive Behavior Interventions
 Journal of the Experimental Analysis of Behavior
 Perspectives on Behavior Science (formerly The Behavior Analyst until 2018)
 The Behavioral Development Bulletin
 The Behavior Analyst Today
 The International Journal of Behavioral Consultation and Therapy
 The Journal of Behavioral Assessment and Intervention in Children
 The Journal of Speech-Language Pathology and Applied Behavior Analysis
 The Psychological Record

Other species
ABA has also been successfully used in other species. Morris uses ABA to reduce feather-plucking in the black vulture (Coragyps atratus).

See also 

 Association for Behavior Analysis International
 Autism rights movement
 Behavior analysis of child development
 Behavior therapy
 Behavioral activation
 Conversion therapy
 Educational psychology
 Parent management training
 Professional practice of behavior analysis

References

Sources

Further reading

External links 

 Applied Behavior Analysis: Overview and Summary of Scientific Support
 Functional Behavioral Assessment, The IRIS Center - U.S. Department of Education, Office of Special Education Programs Grant and Vanderbilt University

Behavior analysis
Behavior
Behavior modification
Behavioral concepts
Behaviorism
Life coaching
Industrial and organizational psychology
Personal development